Lars Erik "Lalla" Hansson (born 10 June 1944, in Stockholm) is a Swedish progg, pop and rock singer. He participates/has participated in the music groups Fabulous Four and Idolerna, and as solo singer he has had great prosperities with hits as "Anna och mej" ("Me and Bobby McGee"), "Han gav upp alltihop (för att spela med sitt band)" ("The Free Electric Band") and "Dagny".

Selected discography
Upp till Ragvaldsträsk
Tur Och Retur
Fångat i Flykten
Enstaka Spår
Hejdlöst
Fabulous Forty

References

External links
Official website

1944 births
Singers from Stockholm
Swedish rock singers
Swedish pop singers
Living people